Desoxyfructo-serotonin is a leprostatic agent.

References

Antileprotic drugs
Phenols
Tryptamines
Monosaccharide derivatives